The Janssen Baronetcy, of Wimbledon in the County of Surrey, was a title in the Baronetage of Great Britain. It was created on 11 March 1715 for the Dutch-born financier Theodore Janssen, who also represented Yarmouth in the House of Commons. The second baronet sat as member of parliament for Dorchester while the fourth and last baronet was member of parliament for the City of London and a Lord Mayor of London. The title became extinct on the latter's death in 1777.

The last baronet's daughter Henrietta Janssen (died 29 July 1840 Twickenham, aged 87) married Lorenzo Moore, MP for Dungannon in Ireland.

Janssen baronets, of Wimbledon (1715)
Sir Theodore Janssen, 1st Baronet ( – 1748)
Sir Abraham Janssen, 2nd Baronet (c. 1699 – 1765)
Sir Henry Janssen, 3rd Baronet (died 1766)
Sir Stephen Theodore Janssen, 4th Baronet (died 1777)

References

Extinct baronetcies in the Baronetage of Great Britain